Qusheh Khani (also Romanized as Qūsheh Khānī; also known as Gūsheh Khānī and Qūsheh Khāneh) is a village in Rudbar Rural District, in the Central District of Tafresh County, Markazi Province, Iran. At the 2006 census, its population was 190, in 40 families.

References 

Populated places in Tafresh County